The 2021 Graz local election was held on 26 September 2021 to elect the members of the Gemeinderat of Graz.

The Communist Party of Austria (KPÖ) became the largest party for the first time in the city's history, winning 29% of votes cast. The previous governing party, the Austrian People's Party (ÖVP), fell from 38% to second place with 26%. The Freedom Party of Austria (FPÖ) also suffered losses and finished in fourth place on 11%, while The Greens moved into third with 17%. The Social Democratic Party of Austria (SPÖ) recorded a slight decline to 9.5%. NEOS – The New Austria won 5.4% and gained a second seat.

Siegfried Nagl, ÖVP mayor of Graz since 2003, announced that he would resign in light of his party's poor result. The KPÖ subsequently formed a coalition with the Greens and SPÖ, and Elke Kahr was elected mayor by the Gemeinderat on 17 November with 28 out of 46 votes. She became the first female mayor of Graz and first communist mayor of an Austrian city.

Background
The Styrian constitution mandates that positions in municipal government (city councillors) be allocated between parties proportionally in accordance with the share of votes won by each; this is known as Proporz. As such, the government of Graz is a perpetual coalition of all parties that qualify for at least one city councillor.

In the 2017 election, the ÖVP made modest gains and retained its first-place position with 38%. The KPÖ remained the second largest party in Graz with 20%. The FPÖ finished in third place with 16%. The Greens suffered slight losses, while the SPÖ fell from third to fifth place with just 10% of the vote. NEOS won a single seat in the council. The city government was dominated by the ÖVP with three councillors, while the KPÖ won two councillors, and the FPÖ and Greens won one each.

Electoral system
The 48 seats of the Gemeinderat of Graz are elected via open list proportional representation with no electoral threshold.

Contesting parties

In addition to the parties already represented in the Gemeinderat, eight parties collected enough signatures to be placed on the ballot:

 Responsibility Earth (ERDE)
 WiR – Together for Graz (WIR)
 Pirate Party of Austria (PIRAT)
 Team HC Strache – Alliance for Austria (HC)
 dieBasis Graz (BASIS)
 Free Citizens' Party Graz (FBP)
 The Austrian PARTEI (DÖP)
 Graz in the Heart (GRAZ)

Opinion polling

Results

Results by district

Aftermath
The victory of the Communist Party of Austria (KPÖ) was unexpected. Elke Kahr herself expressed surprise at the result: "The preliminary election result is a huge success for us and more than gratifying. I didn't expect to gain that much." While conceding the election, mayor Siegfried Nagl quipped: "You can see that the clocks in Graz run differently than in the rest of Austria."

The KPÖ were expected to take over the mayoralty as no practical majority could be formed to oppose them. The Greens were considered a likely partner, but a third party was required for a majority in the Gemeinderat. Although Nagl ruled out working with the KPÖ during the campaign, the new ÖVP leadership took a noticeably softer stance, raising the possibility of cooperation between the two. The SPÖ and NEOS were also possible partners. Elke Kahr previously voiced her preference for pragmatic cooperation on policy matters and "free play of groups in the Gemeinderat" rather than a fixed coalition pact; the process for electing the mayor could enable the KPÖ to win even without a majority.

After a series of exploratory talks, the SPÖ voted on 22 October to start official coalition talks with the KPÖ and Greens. The three parties presented their coalition program on 13 November. Elke Kahr described a "socially, climate-friendly and democratically transparent" Graz as their goal, with plans to expand community housing, access to transit and education, and transform the city centre into a car-free green space. Kahr will become mayor and reclaim the housing portfolio. Overall, the KPÖ will also hold the finance, health, housing, integration, and education portfolios, with Manfred Eber joining Robert Krotzer as the party's third city councillor. Judith Schwentner will become vice-mayor and councillor for transit and planning. The SPÖ, lacking any city councillors, will chair several committees in the Gemeinderat.

The Gemeinderat convened for its constituent session on 17 November. Elke Kahr was elected mayor with 28 out of 46 votes, becoming the first female mayor of Graz and first communist mayor of an Austrian city. As one KPÖ deputy was absent from the session, Kahr received at least one vote from the opposition.

References

Elections in Austria
2021 elections in Austria
Graz
Local elections in Austria
September 2021 events in Austria